SIMO TCI was a computer expo held every November in Madrid, Spain from 1961 to 2013. Its name stands for Salón Internacional de Mobiliario de Oficina / Tecnologías de la Comunicación e Información (International Trade Fair of Office Furniture / Information and Communication Technologies), due to its origin. From 1991, it took place in Madrid's Exhibition Centre IFEMA.

History 
It was conceived as a trade fair devoted to office furniture and its first edition was held in 1961. In 1962 the IBM 1401 and Bull Gamma 60 where showcased, and as electronic, computer and telecommunications equipment were being introduced, the trade fair was gradually turned into a computer expo, to the extent that it would end up moving office furniture to a separate fair. Since 1969, there was more space devoted to computers that to office furniture, but until the late 1980s there was some exhibition space devoted to office furniture.

In its most successful years from late 1990s to early 2000s, it was considered the second largest computer fair in Europe after CeBIT, as more than 900 exhibitors were present, distributed in 65,000 m2 taking up eight IFEMA pavilions, and reaching up 300,000 visitors.

In the late 2000s the number of exhibitors started to decline. This led to the cancellation of the 2008 edition. In 2009 was resumed as SIMO Network, devoted exclusively to business-oriented computing and IT professionals, but this approach wasn't successful and the last SIMO TCI took place in 2013.

Taking advantage of the name, SIMO Educación (SIMO Education) was started in 2014 by IFEMA, devoted only to educational technologies and a much smaller scope (taking up only one pavilion and reaching up about 10,000 visitors).

Sectors (early 2000s) 

Information technologies: computers, terminals, peripheral devices, components, consumables, audiovisuals, electronics
Reproduction
Office technology
Macworld Exposition
Digital photography
Professional software: operating systems and programming languages, vertical and horizontal applications. CAD/CAM/CAE, multimedia.
Architecture Software
Linux area
Telecommunications: communications, mobile telephony, local area networks, interconnectivity, services, servers and operators
E-business-Internet
Consumer electronics
Domotics

Number of visitors

See also 
 CeBIT
 Consumer Electronics Show

References

External links 
 SIMO TCI
 No-Do newsreel about SIMO 65 (Spanish) 
 No-Do newsreel about SIMO 66 (Spanish) 
 No-Do newsreel about SIMO 67 (Spanish)
 No-Do newsreel about SIMO 68 (Spanish) 
 No-Do newsreel about SIMO 70 (Spanish) 
 No-Do newsreel about SIMO 71 (Spanish) 
 No-Do newsreel about SIMO 73 (Spanish) 
 No-Do newsreel about SIMO 74 (Spanish) 
 No-Do newsreel about SIMO 75 (Spanish) 
 Plan of SIMO 2004

Computer-related awards
Trade fairs in Spain
Computer-related trade shows